Helsinki–Riihimäki railway is a railway running between the Helsinki Central railway station and the Riihimäki railway station in Finland, and it is part of the Finnish Main Line. It was opened in 1862 as a part of the Finland's first railway between Helsinki and Hämeenlinna. The Helsinki commuter rail system also runs by the Helsinki–Riihimäki railway.

Services

Commuter trains 

The Helsinki commuter rail lines  and  operate exclusively on the section Helsinki–Riihimäki section, with the former not extending further than Kerava. The core parts of lines  and  lie on the entire extent of the section, though some of these services continue onto the Riihimäki–Tampere railway as well. Line  branches off towards Lahti after making stops at Tikkurila and Kerava. Lines  and  use the section Helsinki–Hiekkaharju, after which they transition onto the Ring Rail Line.

Long-distance trains 
The Helsinki–Riihimäki section is a core part of long-distance transport in Finland. After departing from Helsinki, trains make stops in Pasila and Tikkurila and proceed towards Kerava, from where they will either transfer onto the eastbound Kerava-Lahti railway line or proceed north towards Riihimäki and the regions of Pirkanmaa and Ostrobothnia via the Riihimäki–Tampere railway.

The termini of the routes that pass through the Helsinki–Riihimäki railway include Tampere, Seinäjoki, Vaasa, Ylivieska, Oulu, Rovaniemi, Kemijärvi, Kouvola, Imatra, Joensuu, Kuopio and Kajaani.

References 

Railway lines in Finland
Railway lines opened in 1862